The acronym CCEE may refer to:

 Council of the Bishops' Conferences of Europe
 Canadian Centre for Environmental Education